Fadıl Koşutan (born 7 June 1974) is a Turkish association football coach and former player.

Coaching career 
He started his coaching career on 13 September 2013 as the assistant coach of Galatasaray U16 team. He became the A team goalkeeper coach on 25 November 2013 as assistant to Brazilian goalkeeping coach Cláudio Taffarel. He took part in the team of Fatih Terim, Hamza Hamzaoğlu, Jan Olde Riekerink, Roberto Mancini, Igor Tudor, Mustafa Denizli, Cesare Prandelli, Domènec Torrent and Okan Buruk.

External links
 Galatasaray.org Profile

1974 births
Living people
Footballers from Istanbul
Turkish footballers
Association football goalkeepers
Pendikspor footballers
Kastamonuspor footballers
Alibeyköyspor footballers
Tepecikspor footballers
Beylerbeyi S.K. footballers
Gaziosmanpaşaspor footballers
Galatasaray S.K. (football) non-playing staff